BNS Bhatiary  is an establishment of the Bangladeshi Navy. Its location is in Chittagong, surrounded few hills.

Career
The Vatiary is currently under the command of the Commodore Commanding Chittagong (COMCHIT). About 500 personnel serve at Vatiary, which is one of the firing training bases of the Bangladesh Navy. Vatiary was established for the training and storage of the naval arms, missile and relatives instruments, as well as operating as a naval base.

See also
List of active ships of the Bangladesh Navy

Shore establishments of the Bangladesh Navy
Bangladesh Navy bases